William Davitt Parnell Hickey (28 January 1886 – 16 August 1973) was an Australian rules footballer who played with Melbourne in the Victorian Football League (VFL).

Notes

External links 

Bill Hickey at Demonwiki

1886 births
Australian rules footballers from Victoria (Australia)
Melbourne Football Club players
South Ballarat Football Club players
1973 deaths